Geoffrey Paul Cantor is an American actor and acting coach. He is primarily known for his portrayal as Mitchell Ellison on Daredevil and The Punisher.

Early life and education
Cantor was born on an Air Force base in California. When his father, an Air Force captain and flight surgeon, finished his service, the family moved to Philadelphia. They moved a few more times (Newton Center, Massachusetts and Cherry Hill, New Jersey) as his father completed his internship and residency, and settled in Bergen County. His father was (and is still) involved in community theatre and his mother is a painter. Both of them enjoyed the arts and this resulted in Cantor's appreciation as well, especially the theater. "We were sort of progressive, liberal, Jewish people. I grew up in a time when were sort of at the cutting edge of that." Cantor graduated from Pascack Hills High School.

While attending Amherst College, Cantor came to find acting the most rewarding and intriguing art form, particularly British theatre which he found the most inspirational. Cantor graduated magna cum laude from Amherst College with a degree in theater, and  furthered his acting education at Eugene O'Neill Theater Center and then at the Royal Central School of Speech & Drama in London, England.

Career
He made his TV acting debut in Night Network before appearing in a variety of television shows such as The Street, The Kill Point, All My Children, Life on Mars, Law & Order: Criminal Intent, Deception and House of Cards He gained sudden recognition in 2015 for his role in Daredevil as Mitchell Ellison, the editor-in-chief of the New York Bulletin and boss to Ben Urich. A comic book fan, Cantor thinks his knowledge of Daredevil may have helped him get the role, even though his character does not appear in the comic book series. Despite this Cantor found his work on Daredevil the same as any other job, "Daredevil happened while I was about to do a play. For me there is no real difference between the core of the work. The real difference is the end experience." Cantor would reprise the role in season 2 of Daredevil, which sees Ellison take on a mentor role towards Karen Page, and as a guest star in The Punisher. He also voiced the paparazzo Beverly Felton in the 2013 video game Grand Theft Auto V.

Filmography

References

External links
 
 
 

Living people
Male actors from California
Male actors from New Jersey
Amherst College alumni
Jewish American male actors
Pascack Hills High School alumni
Year of birth missing (living people)
21st-century American Jews